Emir Azemović (born 6 January 1997) is a Montenegrin professional footballer who plays for Serbian club Kolubara as a centre-back.

Club career
Hailing from Novi Pazar, Azemović began his youth career at local club AS Novi Pazar, before joining Partizan's  youth system, where he spent two years.

In August 2015, Azemović signed a five-year contract with Portuguese side Benfica, and was immediately assigned to their B team in the second-tier LigaPro. His deal included a salary of 7,000 euros per month. He made two appearances on the Benfica B bench in September, but did not earn a cap. Instead, he spent most of the season with the Benfica U19 team, appearing in three UEFA Youth League games.

In January 2017, Azemović was loaned out to Fafe, another LigaPro team, until the end of the season. He made his professional debut four months later, playing the full 90 minutes in a 3-1 win over Gil Vicente.

On 5 August 2020, he returned to Slovenia and signed with Aluminij.

International career
Born in Novi Pazar, capital of the Raška District in Southern Serbia and bordering Montenegro, Azemović represented Serbia in 2014 at U17 level. However, by 2017, he was convinced by the Montenegrin FA to switch sporting nationality and represent Montenegro, having debuted in 2017 with their U21 level.

References

External links

 
 
 2016 UEFA Youth League profile

1997 births
Living people
Sportspeople from Novi Pazar
Association football central defenders
Serbian footballers
Serbia youth international footballers
Montenegrin footballers
Montenegro under-21 international footballers
S.L. Benfica B players
AD Fafe players
NK Domžale players
FK Zemun players
Raków Częstochowa players
NK Aluminij players
FK Kolubara players
Liga Portugal 2 players
Serbian SuperLiga players
Ekstraklasa players
Slovenian PrvaLiga players
Serbian expatriate footballers
Montenegrin expatriate footballers
Expatriate footballers in Portugal
Serbian expatriate sportspeople in Portugal
Montenegrin expatriate sportspeople in Portugal
Expatriate footballers in Slovenia
Serbian expatriate sportspeople in Slovenia
Montenegrin expatriate sportspeople in Slovenia
Expatriate footballers in Poland
Serbian expatriate sportspeople in Poland
Montenegrin expatriate sportspeople in Poland
Bosniaks of Serbia 
Bosniaks of Montenegro